Charles Martinet (27 April 1894 – 8 October 1976) was a Swiss racing cyclist. He rode in the 1925 Tour de France.

References

1894 births
1976 deaths
Swiss male cyclists
Place of birth missing